In Hindu mythology Atibala was a servant of Lanka king Ravana. He was a dwarf in nature.

Birth
Details surrounding the birth of Atibala are unknown. He had been created by Ravana as a test-tube baby.

Death
He had been killed by Angada during the Lanka War.

Magic
He had knowledge of some magic, including the ability to hide in any form of matter.

References

Characters in Hindu mythology